Isothrix barbarabrownae is a recently discovered species of rodents of the spiny rat family Echimyidae.

Discovery 

It was discovered in Peru, and is about the same size as a large squirrel, such as a Eurasian red squirrel. It is brown, with a black-and-white tail. It inhabits the Peruvian cloud forest, where it forages for fruit and nuts. It is a nocturnal, climbing rodent which was collected by scientists in 1999, and formally described in 2006. It is named after the biologist and curator, Barbara Elaine Russell Brown.

References

Isothrix
Mammals of Peru
Mammals described in 2006